The 37th Parliament of British Columbia sat from 2001 to 2005. The members of the 37th Parliament were elected in the British Columbia general election held on May 16, 2001.

Members of the 37th Parliament

Members of the 37th Parliament who resigned
Gulzar Cheema, Liberal – Surrey-Panorama Ridge
Gary Farrell-Collins, Liberal – Vancouver-Fairview
Sandy Santori, Liberal – West Kootenay-Boundary

Members of the 37th Parliament elected in byelections
Jagrup Brar, N.D.P. – Surrey-Panorama Ridge

Party standings of the 37th Parliament at investiture

Party standings of the 37th Parliament at Dissolution

References

Political history of British Columbia
Terms of British Columbia Parliaments
2001 establishments in British Columbia
2005 disestablishments in British Columbia